Lina Khelif (born 27 January 1997) is a French-born Algerian international footballer who plays as a midfielder for Toulouse and the Algeria women's national football team. She competed for Algeria at the 2018 Africa Women Cup of Nations, playing in two matches.

References

External links
 

1997 births
Living people
Algerian women's footballers
Algeria women's international footballers
Women's association football midfielders
French women's footballers
Footballers from Lyon
French sportspeople of Algerian descent
Grenoble Foot 38 (women) players